David Judson Clemmons is an American guitarist, singer, and songwriter. He is well known for his groundbreaking musical work in the genre of progressive-metal and post-rock. He is credited as the founder of the bands Damn the Machine, Jud, The Fullbliss & Ministers of Anger.

Career

Ministers of Anger

Ministers Of Anger was a progressive thrash project formed by Clemmons, which included future Machine Head drummer Dave McClain, both also involved with the band Murdercar alongside former Detente guitarist Ross Robinson. Between 1988 and 1991, Ministers Of Anger recorded three demos and one of their songs, "The Great Escape", appeared on Metal Blade's Metal Massacre XI compilation. The project eventually ended as Clemmons joined with Chris Poland as vocalist/co-guitarist to form the band Damn The Machine. In 2013, East Coast indie label Divebomb Records issued a limited edition 14-song Ministers Of Anger demo retrospective titled "Renaissance".

Damn The Machine

Damn The Machine was a progressive metal band based in Los Angeles.  Composed of guitarist Chris Poland (ex-Megadeth, OHM:), his brother Mark Poland on drums, David Clemmons on guitars and vocals, and bassist Dave Randi.  The quartet released only one, self-titled, album.  It was a jazzier metal project than other progressive metal bands of the time, such as Queensrÿche or Fates Warning, and the lyrical content dealt largely with subjects of politics and morality.  The group signed with A&M Records in 1993, releasing one album and three singles.  Damn The Machine went on to tour Europe with Dream Theater, and then embarked on a US tour with Voivod.  Despite this, in 1995, when poor record sales resulted in A&M Records dropping a number of bands from their catalog, Damn The Machine were among them.  Though they had been in the process of writing material for a second album, the split with the record label resulted in a dismembering of the band.  While the rest of the group went to form a new band called Mumbo's Brain, David Clemmons departed to put together a project of his own.

JUD

Joining forces with Virginian school-mates, drummer David Wright (known as Hoss), and bassist Steve Cordrey, the trio went on to form JUD in LA in 1995.  Relying heavily on bass, down-tuned guitars, and moving the slide-rule between the brutality of Prong, the grunginess of Nirvana, and sections of spoken word, Jud were a creation all their own.  Their debut album, "Something Better," produced and mixed in part by Ross Robinson (producer of bands like Korn, Slipknot, Sepultura, etc.), was published by Nois-O-Lution in Europe.  This led the LA-based band to a tour of the continent, followed by a tour of the United States during the following year.

After their US tour, the three went into the studio to record an acoustic album, "Inner Mission," meant as an interlude between their debut and their next full-length release.  This showed a completely different side of the band compared to their electrically charged debut.  In 1998, a slight line-up change resulted in James Schmidt taking over drum duties.  The same year, the band's second album, "Chasing California," was released, leading to a summer festival tour.  JUD entered the studio in late summer of 2000, with Hoss Wright rejoining the band once more, to record what would be their last album with the original line-up.  Released in 2001, "The Perfect Life" benefited from more polished production than their previous efforts.

In 2008, Clemmons, along with previous JUD drummer, James Schmidt, and bassist Jan Hampicke (both Fullbliss regulars at this point) reformed JUD to release a brand new album entitled "Sufferboy."  The three wrote and recorded demos of the tracks before sending them to producer, Jon Caffery, who, after hearing them, asked to produce the project.  The group recorded the album, without a record deal, before contacting Nois-O-Lution about releasing it.  The album, recorded in analog, was released on August 8, 2008.  In an interview that Clemmons did at the time, he called it "the most energetic record I've ever made."

Clemmons and JUD are set to release their newest album on November 17, 2016.  The LP, entitled "Generation Vulture," features a quote on the album artwork which states it is: 'An album for the living.  An album for the dead.'

The Fullbliss

Following the release and tour support for "The Perfect Life," Clemmons decided that he wished to explore other musical projects with different collaborators, effectively ending JUD.  Clemmon's new project, a band which came to be called The Fullbliss, released their first album "Fools And Their Splendor" in 2001.  David was joined by many other musicians, and the album possessed a more acoustic and melancholic feel than JUD, and benefited heavily from violin and viola playing.  In an interview, Clemmons said he wanted an outlet for more emotional and dynamic work, bringing the extremes of life and death under one umbrella, which he felt The Fullbliss allowed him.

Several more albums followed. In 2002, The Fullbliss released a second album entitled "This Temple Is Haunted."  Their third album, "Yes Sir" was released in 2006, which was a mix of upbeat and melancholy material, with a little political satire ('Silicone City') thrown in for good measure.  One difference, David describes in an interview, between this album and previous ones, is that several songs were written in his native Virginia, rather than in Los Angeles.  Another compilation, this time of unreleased material, was released by The Fullbliss in 2007, which was entitled "Revolution Songs (1992–2007)."

Solo Releases

In 2004, Clemmons released his first album strictly under his own name with "Life in the Kingdom of Agreement," a much slower, darker, and more personal album than anything previous to it.  The next release, a compilation of live radio and concert recordings called "Un-Fi" was released in 2005, featuring Clemmons and now-regular violinist, Anne De Wolff.  In 2011, Clemmons released "Cold White Earth," a lo-fi effort that was described on his website as "A Story Of Love, Death And Hope." In April 2020 Clemmons released the epic masterpiece "Tribe & Throne" on his own Record Label Village Slut Records, featuring Thomas Götz (Beatsteaks) on drums, and Earl Grey on bass.  "Tribe & Throne" is considered a long awaited and well deserved breakthrough album for Clemmons.

Discography

References

External links 
 Official David Judson Clemmons site

Living people
Guitarists from Virginia
American male guitarists
Year of birth missing (living people)